The Queen (previously titled The Revenge Queen) is a Singapore Mandarin police procedural which was produced by Wawa Pictures and telecast on Singapore's free-to-air channel, Channel 8 HD. Twenty episodes were produced, with production occurring over 108 days in 2015. It debuted Thursday, 18 February 2016. It stars Jesseca Liu, Priscelia Chan, Vivian Lai, Apple Hong & Jayley Woo as the casts of this series.

Cast

Revenge Queen

Other cast

Cameo appearances

Original Soundtrack

See also
 List of MediaCorp Channel 8 Chinese drama series (2010s)
 List of The Queen episodes

References

Singapore Chinese dramas
2016 Singaporean television series debuts
2016 Singaporean television series endings
Mediacorp Chinese language programmes
Channel 8 (Singapore) original programming